Myrtle Lake is a freshwater lake located on the northern slope of Rampart Mountain East of Cow Creek Meadows, in Chelan County, Washington. Self-issued Alpine Lake Wilderness permit required for transit within the Glacier Peak Wilderness area. Because Myrtle Lake is at the heart of the Alpine Lakes Wilderness, the lake is a popular area for hiking, swimming, and fishing brook trout.

Location
Myrtle lake is located along the western shore of Entiat River and on the eastern slope of a steep hill that leads to Cow Creek Meadows above 5000 feet. The meadows are bordered from north to south by the Entiat Mountains: Devils Smoke Stack, Rampart Mountain and Fourth of July Mountain. To the west, Myrtle lake is bordered by the Chelan Mountains.

Access 
Access to Myrtle Lake is through Cow Creek Trail #1404 which starts at the Entiat River Trailhead across the Cottonwood Guard Station along Forest Service Road 5100. The trail borders Entiat River.

Wolverine Fire (2015) 

Drought conditions throughout the state of Washington resulted in many devastating wildfires throughout Washington in 2015. On June 29, 2015, lightning sparked a fire in Wolverine Creek, which expanded and became part of the Chelan Complex fire. This affected the Entiat River Valley and the area that surrounds Myrtle lake. The fire left the trail closed for two years resulting in a more exposed trail towards the lake.

See also 
 List of lakes of the Alpine Lakes Wilderness

References 

Lakes of Chelan County, Washington
Lakes of the Alpine Lakes Wilderness
Okanogan National Forest